Perşembe (originated from Persian word "پنج شنبه(/pændʒʃænbɛ/)" meaning Thursday) (formerly Vona, Βόνη in ancient Greek, also Heneti, ჰენეთი in Georgian and Laz languages) is a town and district of Ordu Province on the Black Sea coast of Turkey. According to the 2016 census, population of the district is 31,065, with a male population of 15,966 and female population of 15,099.

Legend and history
Perşembe is on the Vona Peninsula on the Black Sea coast and is held to be the point where the legendary Jason and the Argonauts were forced to land during their struggle with the storms and currents of the Black Sea.

For a long time Vona was part of the Roman Empire and its successors the Byzantine Empire and Empire of Trebizond. This era ended in 1461 when Trebizond was overturned by Sultan Mehmet II and Vona was brought into the Ottoman Empire, although there was a Turkish (Chepni Tribes) community in the town before this date. By 1520 the port of Vona was a predominantly Muslim town.

The name of the town derives from the word پنج‌شنبه (penc-şenbe) for Thursday.

Villages
The villages of Perşembe district include Alınca, Anaç, Aziziye, Bekirli, Beyli, Boğazcık, Bolatlı, Çamarası, Çaytepe, Çerli, Doğanköy, Döngeldüzü, Efirli, Ekinciler, Gündoğdu, Hacılar, İmeçli, İstanbulboğazı, Kazancılı, Kovanlı, Kurtuluş, Kutluca, Kuyluca, Mersinköy, Neneli, Okçulu, Ortatepe, Ramazan, Sarayköy, Selimiye, Sırakovancı, Soğukpınar, Şenyurt, Tarlacık, Tepecik, Tepeköy, Yarlı, Yazlık, Yeniköy, Yeniöz, Yeşilköy, and Yumrutaş.

See also
 Cape Jason

Notes

References

External links

 District governor's official website 
 District municipality's official website 
 Road map of Perşembe and environs
 Various images of Perşembe, Ordu

Populated places in Ordu Province
Populated coastal places in Turkey
Districts of Ordu Province
Cittaslow